McCall RaNae Zerboni (born December 13, 1986) is an American professional soccer player who plays as a midfielder for and captains NJ/NY Gotham FC of the National Women's Soccer League (NWSL).

Early life
Born in Camarillo, California, to parents James and Lindy, Zerboni was a four-year letter-winner at San Clemente High School in San Clemente, California. She was named CIF Offensive Player of the Year during her freshman and sophomore years. She was a three-time South Coast League MVP and four-time first-team All-Orange County selection. In 2005, she was named Gatorade Player of the Year. She was ranked as the number 17 overall recruit and fifth-best midfielder in the nation by Student Sports Magazine.

In addition to her high school playing experience, Zerboni was an Olympic Development Program (ODP) State and Region-IV team member and played club soccer for the Southern California Blues for several years, helping them to League Cup Championships in 2001 and 2002, a Region-IV Championship in 2000 and their first-ever Surf Cup title in 2004.

UCLA
Zerboni attended UCLA and played for the Bruins women's soccer team from 2005 to 2009. She scored a goal in her first collegiate match at UCLA, a 3–0 opening day victory over Long Beach State in 2005. Zerboni became the 16th player in UCLA history to register a hat trick in a 5–0 victory over Fresno State in the first round of the 2008 NCAA Tournament. She was named MVP for UCLA's 2008 season.

Club career

Los Angeles Sol (WPS)
Zerboni was chosen as the 47th pick overall in the 2009 WPS Draft by the Los Angeles Sol. In her first season with the Sol, she made 10 appearances with four starts, tallying both a goal and an assist.

Atlanta Beat (WPS) 
Zerboni signed to the Atlanta Beat during the 2009 WPS Expansion Draft.

Western New York Flash (WPS, WPSL Elite, NWSL)
Zerboni signed with the Western New York Flash for the 2011 season.

After the WPS folded in early 2012, Zerboni played for the Western New York Flash in the Women's Premier Soccer League Elite as the team captain.

In January 2013, the Western New York Flash announced that Zerboni would return to the team its inaugural season of the National Women's Soccer League. During the 2013 season Zerboni scored 1 goal in 20 games for the Flash.  In her final season with the Flash, she added another 24 appearances of which 23 were starts while playing 2,036 minutes (ranked seventh overall in the league), scoring three goals, and adding a pair of assists.

Portland Thorns FC (NWSL) 2015
The Portland Thorns FC acquired Zerboni in a trade alongside Kathryn Williamson in exchange for midfielder Amber Brooks on November 6, 2014 in an attempt to give the team more available full-time players for the coming 2015 season, during which the Thorns anticipated needing to fill in for players called up to the national team to participate in the 2015 FIFA Women's World Cup.

Boston Breakers (NWSL) 2016
On October 26, 2015, Boston Breakers announced that they had obtained Zerboni from Portland Thorns FC in a package deal along with Sinead Farrelly for first-round (No. 2 overall) and second-round (No. 20 overall) picks in the 2016 National Women's Soccer League College Draft.

She was traded to WNY Flash on June 14, 2016.

Western New York Flash, 2016
McCall played the remainder of the 2016 NWSL season with the Western New York Flash, starting in all 11 of her 12 caps. The Western New York Flash won the 2016 NWSL Championship after beating the Washington Spirit in penalties.

North Carolina Courage, 2017–2019
It was announced on January 9, 2017, that the Western New York Flash was officially sold to new ownership, moved to North Carolina, and rebranded as the North Carolina Courage. In the 2017 season Zerboni was named to the Team of the Month for July. North Carolina won the 2017 NWSL Shield and advanced to the Championship game, but lost 1–0 to the Portland Thorns. She was named to the 2017 NWSL Best XI.

In 2018 North Carolina repeated as NWSL Shield winners. Zerboni was named to the team of the month in April, May, June & July. She appeared in 20 games for North Carolina. Her 2018 season ended early as she suffered a broken elbow while playing for the U.S WNT in September. As a result, she missed the last regular season game and playoffs. Zerboni was named to the 2018 NWSL Best XI, and was a finalist for the Most Valuable Player Award.

New Jersey/New York Gotham FC, 2020
On January 10, Zerboni was traded to NJ/NY Gotham FC for the rights to Hailie Mace.

International career
In 2003, Zerboni was a member of the United States women's national under-17 soccer team.

On October 20, 2017, Zerboni was called up to the United States senior team. She made her debut as a halftime substitute against South Korea on October 22, 2017, making her the oldest player to earn a first cap for the U.S. women's national team at two months shy of her 31st birthday. She continued to receive call-ups in 2018 and was named to the roster for the 2018 Tournament of Nations. Zerboni suffered a broken elbow in a friendly against Chile on September 4, making her unavailable for the 2018 CONCACAF Women's Championship. She returned to senior team training camps in January 2019.

Personal life
Zerboni has a twin sister, Blake Zerboni.

She is in a relationship with Scott Vallow.

Honors

International
Tournament of Nations: 2018

Club
Western New York Flash
NWSL Champions: 2016

North Carolina Courage
NWSL Champions: 2018, 2019
NWSL Shield: 2017, 2018, 2019

Personal
NWSL Best XI: 2017, 2018

References

External links
 
 UCLA player profile
 Western New York Flash (WPSL Elite) player profile
 McCall Zerboni's Facebook Fanpage
 

Los Angeles Sol players
1986 births
Living people
UCLA Bruins women's soccer players
People from Camarillo, California
American people of Italian descent
Vancouver Whitecaps FC (women) players
Atlanta Beat (WPS) players
National Women's Soccer League players
Western New York Flash players
American women's soccer players
Women's association football midfielders
Boston Breakers players
Portland Thorns FC players
North Carolina Courage players
Sportspeople from Ventura County, California
United States women's international soccer players
Women's Professional Soccer players
Soccer players from California
Twin sportspeople
American twins
NJ/NY Gotham FC players